Allan Rae (born 3 July 1942 in Blairmore, Alberta) is a Canadian composer, conductor, and trumpeter based in Calgary, Alberta. An associate and former board member of the Canadian Music Centre and a member of the Canadian League of Composers, he is particularly known for his works for the theatre which include several musicals and operas as well as incidental music. He has been commissioned to write music for productions mounted by the National Arts Centre, the Shaw Festival, and the Stratford Festival, as well as Theatre Passe Muraille, Vancouver Playhouse, Theatre Calgary, and the Globe Theatre, Regina.  Between 1985 and 2000 he was composer-in-residence at Alberta Theatre Projects.

He has also written numerous symphonic and many chamber works, including commissions for the Calgary Philharmonic and the Calgary Youth Orchestra.  His music has been performed by Carol McLaughlin, Gloria Saarinen and Cenek J. Vrba among others.

Rae studied composition and arranging at the Berklee College of Music. He later studied electronic music and composition with Samuel Dolin at The Royal Conservatory of Music from 1970–1973. He began his career as a trumpeter in the Band of Lord Strathcona's Horse (Royal Canadians). He worked for CBC Calgary TV and radio as a composer and conductor from 1966–1970. He served briefly on the music faculty at the RCMT in 1973–1974.

Works

Solo piano 

Through a Broken Window 1970 (twelve short movements)
Songs for Children 1978 Book #1
Alam Al Mithal 1978
Songs for Children 1980 Book #2 
Poetic Petits #3 (n.d)
Be true, you need not fail 1999

Harp 

Mirror of Galadriel 1977
Fantazzia 1979 		
Be true, you need not fail 2005 (see above for solo piano version)

Chamber music 

String Quartet #1 1967 
Autumn Colours (WW. Quartet) 1969 
A Day in the Life of a Toad (Brass Quintet) 1970
Impressions (WW. Quintet) 1971
Sleep Whispering (Flute, Percussion, Piano) 1971 
String Quartet #2 1971
Things to Play on A Boring Day (Thirteen short Trumpet duets) 1972 
Ode to a Pumpkin (Quintet for Percussion) 1973
Poems for Trio (Violin, Piano, Cello) 1974 
Four Brass Quartets 1975 
On the Wind (Violin, Piano, Cello) 1976
Rainbow Sketches (Flute, Oboe, Violin, Piano, two Percussion) 1976  
Alto Flute Sonata 1977
Improvisations for String Quartet 1977
Improvisations for WW Quartet 1977
Whispering of the Nagual (Flute, Bb Clarinet, Bb Trumpet, Trombone, Cello, Piano and Percussion) 1978 
Images #1 (Trumpet and F Horn) 1979 
Images #2 (Flute and Clarinet) 1979, 
Images #3 (Bb Trumpet, F Horn, Tuba) 1979 
Images #4 (Flute, Bb Clarinet, Bassoon) 1979 
Kiwani Owapi (Two Pianos, Bb Clarinet, Two Percussion) 1981	
Reflections (Violin, Piano, Cello) 1981
Something Old, Something New (Brass Quintet) 1981 
En Passant (Two Marimbas) 1982
Ancien Régime (Cello and Piano) 1986
Caamora (Piano and Violin) 1987 
Serenade (Tuba and Piano) 1991 
Chanson da Camera (String Quartet) 1993 
10 March – Chinook, Hallulelujah (Violin, Flute, Cello, Marimba) 1993
Poetic Petits #2 (Harp and Clarinet) 1993 
Poetic Petits #4 (String Quartet) 1993
Poetic Petits  #5 (Harp, Flute, Bb Clarinet) 1993
Poetic Petits #6 (String Quartet) 1993  
Poetic Petits#7 (Bb Clarinet, F Horn, Harp, Marimba) 1993
Poetic Petits #8 (Alto Flute, Bb Clarinet, F Horn, Marimba, Harp) 1993
Poetic Petits #9 (Alto Flute, Marimba, Harp) 1993
Circles (Clarinet, Bassoon Harp)1996 
Dialogues (Alto Flute, Bb Clarinet, F Horn, Marimba, Harp) 1996
Echar La Casa por la Ventana (String Quartet) 1996
Hay Que Gozar Mucho Para Desquitarse do la Vida (String Quartet, Alto Flute, Harp, Marimba)1996
Todo esto muy Diverdo (Brass Quintet) 1996
Romance (Oboe and Bassoon) 1997 
Even a Tyrannosaurus can be Romantic (Tuba Quartet) 1998
Whispering of the Nagual (Flute, Bb Clarinet, Violin, Viola, Cello, Percussion, Piano) 1978, revised in 1998
Dialogue (Bb Clarinet, Piano, Drums and Cello)1999 
Energy (Piano, 2 Violins, Viola and Cello) 1999 
From the wings of a raven (Alto Flute, Bass Clarinet, 2 Violins, Viola and Cello) 1999
If The Raven Speaks (Violin, Viola and Cello) 1999
I must speak (Clarinet and Marimba) 1999
I too remember (Alto Flute, Piano and Cello) 1999 
There was peace (Violin and Viola) 1999 
Visions of the Past from the Future (Flute, Clarinet, Piano, Drums, 2 Violins, Viola and Cello) 1999 
With force (Violin, Viola and Cello) 1999
You must pay attention (Flute, Clarinet, Piano, Drums, 2 Violins, Viola and Cello) 1999
Impromptu (Marimba and Cello) 2002
Scherzando (Marimba and Cello) 2002
Tess (Piano and narrator) 2005
Three Movements for Piano and Violin 2006 
Winter Chinook (Trio for three Harps) 2006
A Road Through Alberta Foothills (Bass Clarinet, Piano and Violin) 2009

Chamber orchestra 

Db Harp Concerto 1976
Sonata for Bass Clarinet 1976 Strings and Bb Bass Clarinet  
Concerto for Bass 1977  
Concerto for Violin and String Ensemble 1979 
D Minor Piano Concerto 1978

Choral 

Listen to the Wind (Chorus and Orchestra) 1973
Keltic Suite (SATB unaccompanied) 1993
Transition (SATB and Orchestra) 1993
Pacific Suite (SATB and String Orchestra) 1994
Gaia – Earth Images 2009

Orchestra 
Trip (youth orchestra) 1970
Wheel of Fortune 1971
Two Thousand Years Ago 1972
Symphony # 1 1972 "In the Shadow of Atlantis"
Love is Me 1972
The Hippopotamus 1972
Celebration (youth orchestra) 1974	
Image for Orchestra 1975
The Alberta Pioneers (youth orchestra) 1980
Symphony  #2 1978 "Winds of Change"
Symphony  #3 1980
Mirror of Galadriel 1982 (see above for solo harp version)
L`heure Entre Chien et Loup 1994
Mist of Summer Seas (string orchestra) 1995 
Standing Stones 1995
Imagenés de Baja (string orchestra) 1996
Tu Hablas muy Bien 1996, Concerto for Trumpet
Celebration of Spring 1998, (in four movements)
Take Back the Ring 2001
'Alam Al Mithal'  (n.d.)

Dance drama/ballet 

Like Gods, Like Gods Among Them 1973 Two Act Dance Drama
Mirror, Mirror 1974 one act, two scene ballet
Scarecrow 1975 Mime stage show

Music theatre 
You Two Stay Here and the Rest Come With Me (1968–9)
Trip (1969–70)
Where Are You Now That We Need You Simon Fraser? (1971)
Beware the Quickly Who (1971)
Charles Manson AKA Jesus Christ (1972)

See also
In Good Company album

References

External links
Calgary’s history was groovy, man: Hippie-era musical revamped and revived for Alberta’s 100th Anniversary By Martin Morrow, FFWD, Thursday, 7 April 2005
Kokoro Choir – Keltic Song (Allan Rae) at YouTube

1942 births
Living people
Berklee College of Music alumni
Canadian male composers
Canadian military musicians
Musicians from Alberta
The Royal Conservatory of Music alumni
Academic staff of The Royal Conservatory of Music
Lord Strathcona's Horse soldiers